Molkenboer is a Dutch surname.

Notable people with this surname include:
  (1796-1863), Dutch architect
 Willem Molkenboer (1844-1915), Dutch sculptor
His children:
 Theo Molkenboer (1871–1920), Dutch painter
  (1872-1960), Dutch painter
  (1879-1948), Dutch monk and literary scholar
 Phemia Molkenboer (1883–1940), Dutch ceramist